Lumbres is a commune in the Pas-de-Calais department in the Hauts-de-France region of France.

Geography
Lumbres is an industrial town built on former marshes at the crossroads of the valleys of the rivers Aa and Bléquin, some 6 miles (10 km) southwest of Saint-Omer, at the junction of the D342 and D225 road. The commune is now by-passed by the N42. The landscape is marred by the vast quarries and the huge chimney of the cement works.

Population

History
Evidence of prehistoric occupation, at the place known as the Montagne de Lumbres has been discovered by. Pontier and Canon Collet, of the abbey of Wisques, who were the first to study the prehistory of the area, including Arques, Elnes and Wavrans. Because of its industrial importance, and proximity to fortified V2 sites, the commune suffered heavily from Allied bombing during World War II.

Places of interest
 The church of St.Sulpice, dating from the seventeenth century.
 The fourteenth century Château d'Acquembronne.
 Old watermills.

Notable people
 Doctor Georges Pontier, naturalist, local prehistoric specialist and paleontologist.

See also
Communes of the Pas-de-Calais department

References

External links

 Lumbres Tourist Office 
 Local history website 

Communes of Pas-de-Calais